The Oregon East Symphony is an orchestra based in Pendleton, Oregon, United States. Highlights of the orchestra's repertoire include ongoing cycles of the orchestral works of Beethoven and Mahler, as well as major works by Elgar, Mozart, Hindemith, Rachmaninoff and Dvořák. The orchestra has also presented world-premieres of works by composers including Emily Doolittle, John McKinnon, Leandro Espinosa, Margaret Mayer, and the film-composer Christopher Thomas.

History
The Oregon East Symphony was created in 1986 by a consortium of local musicians and music lovers who wanted to establish a community orchestra in Pendleton, Oregon. Pendleton, population 17,310, is over 200 miles from the nearest metropolitan area.

General information
The Oregon East Symphony and Chorale offer a subscription series of five classical concerts and perform a yearly Holiday Concert, which often features other local ensembles. In 2001, the OES founded a new training orchestra, the A Sharp Players.
The orchestra's primary home is the Vert Auditorium.

Youth Programs
Playing for Keeps is a unique and comprehensive music education project, which was initiated in 2001 by the Oregon East Symphony Board of Directors.

The Goals of the project are:
· To help rural young people gain access to new cultural opportunities.
· To forge new alliances between the OES and local school districts.
· To give young people who cannot afford musical instruction and/or instruments a chance to participate in music lessons, rehearsal and performance.
· To develop a new awareness concerning the role of a community orchestra and chorus in the cultural health of Eastern Oregon. 
 
Many projects make up the Playing for Keeps program:
 Raising the Bar Players  This program is open by audition to advanced-level high school string players and allows them to perform alongside the Oregon East Symphony for certain performances. The program is headed by the orchestra's principal cellist Zach Banks, while occasionally being directed by the principle conductor Beau Benson.
 A-Sharp Players  This preparatory orchestra is open to mid-level musicians of any age and gives them the opportunity to experience performing with a large ensemble. The program was directed by Bruce Walker, assistant conductor of the Oregon East Symphony from 2008-2018. Zach Banks, principal cellist of the Oregon East Symphony, currently leads this ensemble.
 Preludes  The Preludes string orchestra is open to beginning to intermediate string musicians of any age who can read music. Melinda Tovey, a first violinist in the orchestra, directs this group.
 Music Lesson and Instrument Scholarships  Students are supported in the study of their chosen instrument through a fund that helps with the cost of music lessons and instrument rental.  
 Musician Scholarships  Young people who perform with the Symphony or Chorale are provided with stipends and travel costs for each concert that they participate in. This allows them to pursue their musical studies instead of having to hold down part-time jobs.
 Young Artists Competition  A professional review panel conducts competitive auditions for young musicians in the region.  Winners of this competition are invited to perform with the Symphony as a featured soloist.
 Family and Young People’s Concerts  This annual concert features the winners of the Symphony’s Young Artists Competition and offers a youth-oriented concert program. The concert is also performed again twice during a weekday for school groups from the area.
 Tickets for Kids  During each school year, the OES distributes free regular season concert tickets to area youth throughout the school system.

Oregon East Symphony Chorale
From early on, the OES organization included a volunteer symphony chorus. From 1985-1999, the chorale was directed by Lee Friese. During the tenure of Kenneth Woods, the choir has been directed by Woods and a number of guest conductors and chorus masters, including Cyril Myers, Randal Thomas, Cheryl Carlson, Michael Frasier,  and William Mayclin.

Chorale highlights of recent years include performances of Dvorak's Stabat Mater, Mahler's Symphony no. 2, Beethoven's Symphony no. 9, Mozart's C Minor Mass, the Bach Christmas Oratorio and Bizet's Carmens. The chorale also performs on the annual holiday concerts, where it often focuses on light, seasonal repertoire under the direction of the chorus master.

References
 Oregonian Feature, May 27, 2007

External links
 Oregon East Symphony (official website)
 May 27, 2007 Oregonian article on OES

1986 establishments in Oregon
Musical groups established in 1986
Orchestras based in Oregon
Pendleton, Oregon